A Distant Mirror: The Calamitous 14th Century is a narrative history book by the American historian Barbara Tuchman, first published by Alfred A. Knopf in 1978.
It won a 1980 U.S. National Book Award in History.

The main title, A Distant Mirror, conveys Tuchman's thesis that the death and suffering of the 14th century reflect those of the 20th century, particularly the horrors of World War I.

Summary 
The book's focus is the Crisis of the Late Middle Ages which caused widespread suffering in Europe in the 14th century. Drawing heavily on Froissart's Chronicles, Tuchman recounts the histories of the Hundred Years' War, the Black Plague, the Papal Schism, pillaging mercenaries, anti-Semitism, popular revolts including the Jacquerie in France, the liberation of Switzerland, the Battle of the Golden Spurs, and various peasant uprisings. She also discusses the advance of the Islamic Ottoman Empire into Europe until the disastrous Battle of Nicopolis. However, Tuchman's scope is not limited to political and religious events. She begins with a discussion of the Little Ice Age, a change in climate that reduced average temperatures in Europe well into the mid-19th century, and describes the lives of all social classes, including nobility, clergy, and peasantry.

Much of the narrative is woven around the life of the French nobleman Enguerrand de Coucy. Tuchman chose him as a central figure partly because his life spanned much of the 14th century, from 1340 to 1397. A powerful French noble who married Isabella, eldest daughter of Edward III of England, Coucy's ties put him in the middle of events.

Critical reception 
A Distant Mirror received much popular acclaim. A reviewer in History Today described it as an enthralling work full of "vivid pen-portraits". In The Spectator, David Benson called it "an exciting and even bracing" book which did away with many sentimental myths about the Middle Ages. It also received a favorable review in the Los Angeles Times, though in the Saturday Review, Ted Morgan described it as a "noble failure".

However, scholarly reaction was muted. In the journal Speculum, Charles T. Wood praised Tuchman's narrative abilities but described the book as a "curiously dated and old-fashioned work" and criticized it for being shaped by the political concerns of the United States in the late 1960s and early 1970s. Bernard S. Bachrach criticized Tuchman's reliance on secondary sources and dated translations of medieval narratives at the expense of archival research, and characterized the book as a whole as "a readable fourteenth-century version of the Fuzz n' Wuz (cops and corpses) that dominates the evening news on television." Thomas Ohlgren agreed with many of Bachrach's criticisms, and further took issue with many perceived anachronisms in Tuchman's characterization of the medieval world and a lack of scholarly rigor. William McNeill, writing in the Chicago Tribune, thought that A Distant Mirror, while well-written on a technical level, did not present an intelligible picture of the period.

The book inspired Katherine Hoover to write her composition Medieval Suite.

Publications 

 A Distant Mirror: The Calamitous 14th Century
Publisher: Ballantine Books; Reissue edition (July 12, 1987)  or  paperback
 Publisher: Alfred A. Knopf; Reissue edition (August 1978)  or  hardcover

Notes

References

1978 books
20th-century history books
Alfred A. Knopf books
History books about Europe
History books about the Middle Ages
National Book Award-winning works
14th century